Anton Bruckner (1824–1896) was an Austrian composer.

Bruckner may also refer to:
Bruckner (surname)
Anton Bruckner Private University for Music, Drama, and Dance, in Austria
Bruckner Expressway, in the Bronx, New York
Bruckner Glacier, Greenland

See also
The Bruckner Problem
Bruckner rhythm
International Bruckner Society
Bruckner Orchestra Linz